Shaikh Dawood Khan (16 December 1916 – 21 March 1992), also known as Ustad Shaikh Dawood, Ustad Sheikh Dawood and Daud Khan, was a performer on the Indian tabla. He was formerly a staff artist at All India Radio, Hyderabad, India.

Early life and career
Shaikh Dawood Khan was born in Sholapur, Maharashtra on 16 December 1916. His father Hashim Sahib was a draughtsman in the PWD (Public Works Department), Bijapur, Karnataka, India.

Shaikh Dawood received his training under several notable masters.  These include Mohammad Kasim of Sholapur, Ustad Alladiya Khan of Hyderabad, Ustad Mohammad Khan of Hyderabad, Ustad Chote Khan of Hyderabad, and Ustad Mehboob Khan Mirajkar.

In his lifetime, he accompanied most of the great musicians of the era. These include Aftab-e-Mausiki Ustad Faiyaz Khan, Ustad Vilayat Hussain Khan (vocalist), Ustad Bade Ghulam Ali Khan, Ustad Barkat Ali Khan, Roshanara Begum, Abdul Wahid Khan (Begum Akhtar's guru), Pandit Bhimsen Joshi, Pandit Sawai Gandharva, Pandit Basawaraj Raj Guru, Nazakat and Salamat Ali Khan, Mushtaq Hussain Khan, Pandit D. V. Paluskar, Pandit Vinayakrao Patwardhan, Ustad Allaudin Khan, Ustad Ali Akbar Khan, Girija Devi, Pandit Ravi Shankar and Ustad Vilayat Khan (sitar player).

Awards and recognition
In his life he received numerous awards: 
Sangeet Natak Akademi Award - 1991  

Unfortunately he was too ill to attend the award ceremony and died shortly after the awards ceremony.
 Hindu-Muslim Unity Front Award in 1975

References

20th-century Indian male classical singers
1916 births
1992 deaths
Tabla players
All India Radio people
People from Maharashtra
Indian percussionists
20th-century drummers
Recipients of the Sangeet Natak Akademi Award